The Texas State Guard Commanding General's Individual Award is the tenth highest military decoration that can be conferred to a service member of the Texas Military Forces. Subsequent decorations are conferred by a bronze or silver twig of four oak leaves with three acorns on the stem device.

Eligibility 
The Commanding General's Individual Award may be conferred to any service member of the Texas State Guard by the Commanding General at any Texas State Guard function or activity for exceptional performance, but of a lesser degree than required for award of a higher decoration. The decoration may be conferred by the Commanding General impromptu or through recommendation by unit commanders.

Authority
Unknown

Description

Ribbon 
The Texas State Guard Commanding General's Individual Award is a service ribbon consisting of 2 alternating colors of green and orange in varying width stripes.

Device 
A bronze twig of four oak leaves with three acorns on the stem device, ¼ of an inch in length, is conferred for second and succeeding decorations. A silver leaf is worn in lieu of five bronze leaves. Silver leaves are worn to the wearer's right of a bronze leaf.

Notable recipients

See also 

 Awards and decorations of the Texas Military
 Awards and decorations of the Texas government

 Texas Military Forces
 Texas Military Department
 List of conflicts involving the Texas Military

External links
Texas State Guard Commanding General's Individual Award

Awards and decorations of the Texas Military Forces

References 

Texas Military Department
Texas Military Forces